Cystoseira crassipes is a species of seaweed native to northeast Asia.

References

Fucales